Quartet is the eighth album by Bill Frisell to be released on the Elektra Nonesuch label. It was released in 1996 and features performances by Frisell, trumpeter Ron Miles, trombonist Curtis Fowlkes and violinist and tuba player Eyvind Kang. Tracks 1, 5, 6, 7, 9, and 12 are from Gary Larson's Tales from the Far Side (1994), an animated television special created by Gary Larson. Tracks 3 and 13 are from the Italian film La scuola (1995) directed by Daniele Luchetti. Tracks 4 and 10 were written for the Buster Keaton film Convict 13 (1920).

Reception
The AllMusic review by Scott Yanow awarded the album 4 stars, stating, "This CD uses a rather unusual instrumentation, a quartet composed of Frisell, trumpeter Ron Miles, trombonist Curtis Fowlkes and Eyvind Kang, who doubles on violin and tuba. Ten of the 13 Frisell originals on the release were originally written for films (including one for Gary Larson, "Tales from the Far Side," and one for a Buster Keaton movie "Convict 13"), and the resulting music is tightly arranged yet spontaneous, episodic, and sometimes a bit nutty, but also strangely logical. Whether it be the old-timey theme to "Dead Ranch," the blues in "Convict 13," a few somber ballads, or hints at early Duke Ellington (particularly by Miles' wah-wah trumpet), this is a continually interesting, offbeat set."

Track listing
All compositions by Bill Frisell except as indicated.
 "Tales From The Far Side" – 6:27
 "Twenty Years" – 2:55
 "Stand Up, Sit Down" – 5:37
 "Convict 13" – 5:36
 "In Deep" – 3:10
 "Egg Radio" – 4:31
 "The Bacon Bunch" – 4:26
 "Prelude" (Frisell, Miles) – 1:36
 "Bob's Monsters" – 8:44
 "The Gallows" – 6:14
 "What?" – 3:26
 "Dead Ranch" – 4:27
 "Coffaro's Theme" – 4:27

Personnel
Bill Frisell – electric and acoustic guitars
Ron Miles – trumpet, piccolo trumpet
Eyvind Kang – violin, tuba
Curtis Fowlkes – trombone

References 

1996 albums
Bill Frisell albums
Nonesuch Records albums